eMadlangeni Local Municipality, previously known as Utrecht Local Municipality, is an administrative area in the Amajuba District of KwaZulu-Natal in South Africa.

Main places
The 2001 census divided the municipality into the following main places:

Politics 

The municipal council consists of eleven members elected by mixed-member proportional representation. Six councillors are elected by first-past-the-post voting in six wards, while the remaining five are chosen from party lists so that the total number of party representatives is proportional to the number of votes received. 

In the election of 1 November 2021 the African National Congress (ANC) lost its majority, with both the ANC and Inkatha Freedom Party (IFP) winning four seats on the council.

The following table shows the results of the 2021 election.

References

External links
 http://emadlangeni.gov.za/

Local municipalities of the Amajuba District Municipality
EMadlangeni Local Municipality